Tony Voce (born October 30, 1980) is an American former professional ice hockey player. Voce was the first Philadelphia native to play for the Philadelphia Flyers organization.

Playing career
Voce played college hockey at Boston College. In his four years there, he recorded 90 goals and 77 assists to go along with 207 penalty minutes. As a senior, he finished second in the nation in goals in the NCAA, and for the second time (also as a sophomore) was awarded the Norman F. Bailey Award as team MVP. In addition, he was named to the All-Hockey East First Team and was an AHCA First Team All-American.

After being signed as an undrafted free agent by his hometown team, the Philadelphia Flyers, he was sent to their minor league affiliate, the Philadelphia Phantoms. Voce was a member of the 2004–05 Calder Cup winning Philadelphia Phantoms team. He became one of the team's top goal-scorers, totaling 50 goals in 2 years as a member of the Phantoms before being loaned to Grand Rapids.

On March 17, 2008  he signed with the Straubing Tigers of the Deutsche Eishockey Liga and transferred November 28, 2008 to EC Graz 99ers of the Erste Bank Hockey League. After two weeks in Austria, he was released by the team.

Awards and honors

References

External links

1980 births
American men's ice hockey left wingers
Boston College Eagles men's ice hockey players
Grizzlys Wolfsburg players
Grand Rapids Griffins players
Graz 99ers players
Ice hockey players from Pennsylvania
Living people
Ontario Reign (ECHL) players
Philadelphia Phantoms players
Sportspeople from Philadelphia
Straubing Tigers players
AHCA Division I men's ice hockey All-Americans
NCAA men's ice hockey national champions